Shao Xinyu (born November 1967) is a Chinese engineer and the current Vice Minister of Science and Technology, in office since September 2021. He previously served as Communist Party Secretary of Huazhong University of Science and Technology from 2017 to 2021.

Biography
Shao was born in Jingjiang, Jiangsu, in November 1968. His father Shao Daosheng is a researcher at the Institute of Sociology, Chinese Academy of Social Sciences. He attended Jingjiang High School. He earned a bachelor's degree in 1986, a master's degree in 1990, and a doctor's degree in 1992, all from Huazhong University of Science and Technology. He pursued advanced studies in the United States, earning a doctor's degree from the University of Michigan. He was a research assistant at Ford Motor Company between June 1996 and August 1998.

He joined the mechanics faculty of Huazhong University of Science and Technology in December 1998 and was promoted to dean in October 2002. In July 2013, he became executive vice-president, a position at department level. In December 2017 he was promoted to Communist Party Secretary of the university, a position at vice-ministerial level. In September 2021, he was appointed Vice Minister of Science and Technology by the State Council.

Honours and awards
 2002 State Science and Technology Progress Award (Second Class) 
 2008 State Science and Technology Progress Award (Second Class) 
 November 2018 Science and Technology Award of the Ho Leung Ho Lee Foundation 
 November 22, 2019 Member of the Chinese Academy of Engineering (CAE)

References

1968 births
Living people
People from Jingjiang
Huazhong University of Science and Technology alumni
University of Michigan alumni
Engineers from Jiangsu
Academic staff of Huazhong University of Science and Technology
Members of the Chinese Academy of Engineering